Coatepec (Nahuatl for "at the snake hill") may refer to:

Geography
Coatepec Harinas, a municipality in the State of Mexico
Coatepec, Puebla, a municipality in Puebla
Coatepec, Santiago Texcalcingo, a village in Santiago Texcalcingo, Oaxaca
Coatepec, Veracruz, a municipality in Veracruz
Coatepec, Villaflores, a village in Villaflores, Chiapas

Other
Coatepec Nahuatl, a variety of the Nahuatl language
Coatepec Sandstone, a geological formation in Mexico